Christiane Nord (born 13 September 1943) is a German translation scholar.

Biography
She studied translation at Heidelberg University (B.A. Honours, 1967); in 1983 she obtained her PhD in Romance Studies, with habilitation in applied translation studies and translation pedagogy. From 1967 she has been involved in translator training at the universities of Heidelberg, Vienna, Hildesheim, Innsbruck and Magdeburg (1996–2005).

She was married to theologian Klaus Berger who passed away in 2020. They worked together to translate sections of the Bible.

Works
 "Textdesign - verantwortlich und gehirngerecht". In: Holz-Mänttäri, Justa/Nord, Christiane, eds.: Traducere Navem. Festschrift für Katharina Reiß zum 70. Geburtstag. Tampereen yliopisto, 1993, pages 301–320. .
 Translating as a Purposeful Activity. Functionalist Approaches Explained. 1997.
 Fertigkeit Übersetzen. Ein Kurs zum Übersetzenlehren und -lernen. Berlin: BDÜ Service Verlag (Schriftenreihe des BDÜ 38) (2nd edition of Nord 2002). 
 Kommunikativ handeln auf Spanisch und Deutsch. Ein übersetzungsorientierter funktionaler Sprach- und Stilvergleich, Wilhelmsfeld: Gottfried Egert Verlag, 2003.
 Text Analysis in Translation: Theory, Methodology and Didactic Application of a Model for Translation-Oriented Text Analysis, Amsterdam-New York: Rodopi, 2nd. revised edition, 2005.
 Kommunikativ handeln auf Spanisch und Deutsch: ein übersetzungsorientierter funktionaler Sprach- und Stilvergleich. Egert, Wilhelmsfeld 2003, ISBN 3-926972-99-8.

References

External links
 Website of Christiane Nord, PhD

1943 births
Living people
People from Eberswalde
Heidelberg University alumni
German translators
English–German translators
Spanish–German translators
Translators of the Bible into German
German translation scholars
Academic staff of Heidelberg University
Academic staff of the University of Vienna
Academic staff of the University of Innsbruck
Female Bible Translators
Translation theorists